Louis Davis may refer to:

Chip Davis (born 1947), born Louis F. Davis, American musician
Louis Davis (architect) (1884–1962), American architect
Louis Davis (painter) (1860–1941), British artist

See also
Lou Davis (1881–1961), American songwriter
Louis Henry Davies (1845–1924), Canadian lawyer, politician and judge